Fortune is an unincorporated community in Cross County, Arkansas, United States.

References

Unincorporated communities in Cross County, Arkansas
Unincorporated communities in Arkansas